Velký Bor is a municipality and village in Klatovy District in the Plzeň Region of the Czech Republic. It has about 600 inhabitants.

Administrative parts
Villages of Jetenovice and Slivonice are administrative parts of Velký Bor.

Notable people
Sylvester Krnka (1825–1903), rifle maker and inventor

References

Villages in Klatovy District